Lenart Praunsperger was a Slovenian politician of the early 16th century. He became mayor of Ljubljana in 1506.
He was succeeded by Jakob Stettenfelder in 1507.

References 

Year of birth missing
Year of death missing
16th-century Slovenian people
Mayors of Ljubljana